The Illinois Arts Council is a government agency of the state of Illinois formed to encourage development of the arts throughout Illinois.  Founded in 1965 by the Illinois General Assembly, the Illinois Arts Council provides financial and technical assistance to artists, arts organizations, and community organizations with arts programming.

The Illinois Arts Council
The Illinois Arts Council is governed by up to 21 members appointed by the Governor of Illinois who serve four-year terms.  They meet three times a year.  Assisted by volunteer advisory panels, they distribute grants and oversee arts programs and services.

Many arts organizations in Illinois rely on funding from the IAC each year. Governor Rod Blagojevich drastically cut the budget in 2007 in what many saw as a political move against his chief rival, Michael Madigan, whose wife is the head of the IAC.

Programs
Artist Fellowship Program
Arts & Foreign Language
Arts Service Organizations
Artstour & Live Music
Community Arts Access
General Operating Support
Individual Artist Support
Literary Awards
Master/Apprentice Program
Partners in Excellence
StARTS Program
Summer Youth Employment in the Arts

Services
 Application Workshops
 Artists' Registry, a mailing list to link Illinois artists with professional opportunities
 Artslinks, sites through Illinois with coordinators and Illinois Arts Council publications
 Awareness Meetings
 Directory of Illinois Performing Arts Presenters
 Directory of Local Arts Agencies
 Illinois Art Fair Directory, an annual publication
 Technical Assistance

Illinois Arts Council members

 Nora Daley, Chairman
 Rhoda A. Pierce, Vice-chairman
 Joshua Davis-Ruperto, Executive Director
 Les Begay, Member
 Joan Clifford	Member
 Michael R. Conn, Member
 Richard Daniels, Member
 Henry Godinez, Member
 Sarah Herda, Member
 Anne Kaplan, Member
 Jodie Kavensky, Member
 Valeri King, Member
 Shirley R. Madigan, Member
 Robert Maguire, Member
 Gary Matts, Member
 Peggy Montes,	Member
 Pemon Rami, Member
 Christina Steelman, Member
 Andre Washington, Member

References

 Illinois Arts Council, "Annual Report 2006", HeARTland Volume 12, Number 1, May 2007

External links
Illinois Arts Council

Art in Illinois
Arts Council
Arts councils of the United States
Government agencies established in 1965
1965 establishments in Illinois